Willi Meyer (born 21 March 1965) is a German diver. He competed in two events at the 1988 Summer Olympics.

References

External links
 

1965 births
Living people
German male divers
Olympic divers of West Germany
Divers at the 1988 Summer Olympics
Sportspeople from Heerlen
20th-century German people